Monique Brumby (born 16 September 1974, in Devonport) is an Australian Indie pop/rock singer-songwriter, guitarist and producer. Her debut single, "Fool for You", peaked into the top 40 in the Australian Recording Industry Association (ARIA) ARIA Singles Charts, and provided an ARIA Award for Best New Talent at the ARIA Music Awards of 1996. Her single, "Mary", won an ARIA Music Awards of 1997 for ARIA Award for Best Female Artist.

Brumby's songs have been used for television: Neighbours, Home and Away, McLeod's Daughters, The Secret Life of Us and Heartbreak High; and in the Australian films: Diana & Me (1997) and Occasional Coarse Language (1998).

Early years
Brumby was born in 1974 in Devonport, Tasmania, and moved to Hobart at age seven. She attended three different primary schools including Lauderdale Primary School (in nearby Clarence) and then secondary school at St Michael's Collegiate School to Year 12; she sang in stage musicals and tried out for women's soccer. In 1991, she was selected for the Australian under-19 youth team in a three test series against New Zealand. While still at school, Brumby busked by singing to acoustic guitar in Hobart streets and obtained some part-time gigs. In 1993, after leaving school, Brumby had paying gigs in Hobart clubs and then travelled to England on a working holiday as a boarding house mistress for a year; she returned to Tasmania to write songs and, in 1995, relocated to Melbourne, where she performed in local pubs and clubs. She joined a guitar-based band and wrote songs with its members before leaving to concentrate on her own songs. In September 1995, she was the support act for Jeff Buckley's performance at The Athenaeum in Melbourne and at the Phoenician Club in Sydney.

Career

1995-1997 : "Fool for You" to Thylacine
Brumby signed with Sony Records, she wrote and recorded her debut single, "Fool for You", which was released in April 1996 and peaked at No. 31 on the Australian Recording Industry Association (ARIA) ARIA Singles Charts. It provided an ARIA Award for Best New Talent at the ARIA Music Awards of 1996. The single was also nominated for Breakthrough Artist – Single and Producer of the Year for its producer, David Bridie (member of My Friend The Chocolate Cake). Musicians used on the recording were: Rob Craw on guitar and backing vocals, Will Dickins on bass guitar, Stephen Moffatt on guitar, and Greg Patten (also from My Friend The Chocolate Cake) on drums. In October 1996, Brumby attended a Mushroom Records-run writers' workshop, she worked with Paul Kelly to co-write "Melting". Kelly included the track on his Words and Music released in 1998. Brumby's version appeared on her 2006 album, Into the Blue.

"Mary" was released in September 1996. In addition to Craw, Moffatt and Patten, Brumby's session musicians for the EP included: Michael Barker on drums, Bridie on piano and keyboards, and Paul Kelly on harmonica. "Mary" won the 1997 'Best Female Artist' ARIA for Brumby and received another nomination as 'Producer of the Year' for Bridie.

Her debut album, Thylacine, was produced by Bridie and released in June 1997 by Sony/Columbia. Brumby used session musicians: Barker, Bridie, Craw, Dickins, Moffatt and Patten, with Helen Mountfort (My Friend The Chocolate Cake) on cello, Simon Polinski on bass guitar. In June and July, Brumby was the support act for Kelly on a national tour. Thylacine provided Brumby with an ARIA Award nomination for 'Best Female Artist' and the associated single, "The Change in Me" was nominated for "Song of the Year" in 1998. The B-side, "My Friend Jack", was co-written with Maryanne Window, her guitarist/bass guitarist. Brumby was also awarded Young Tasmanian of the Year in the field of the Arts. Also in 1997, an art photography magazine, Black + White, published The black+white album – A visual celebration of Australian music which included semi-nude photos of Brumby.

1998-2002: Eventide to Signal Hill
Brumby co-produced her EP, Eventide, with Polinski, which was released on Sony/Columbia in August 1998 with its lead track, "Wrecking Ball" receiving most airplay. For the EP, Brumby provided songwriting, vocals, guitars (acoustic and electric) and djembe with Window on acoustic and bass guitars, and co-writing "Way it Goes" with Brumby. Brumby described Eventide:

Brumby started writing songs and making preliminary recordings for her second album, Signal Hill, however problems occurred with Sony and she left to form her own label, Little Wind. Her first independent release was "Silver Dollars" in November 2000 which was distributed by M. Brumby also provided vocals, guitars and keyboards, with assistance of session musicians including her live band, The Riders, consisting of Window, Tom Rouch and Shamus Goble. Additional musicians were Tim Powels (The Church), Joe Creighton (The Revelators), Barry Palmer (Hunters & Collectors, Deadstar), Angus Husband, Stuart Harrison, Bruce Haymes (The Casuals, Professor Ratbaggy), Chris Wilson, Adam Pedretti (Killing Heidi), Craig Patterson and Rachel Samuel. Signal Hill was released on 7 October 2002 by Little Wind distributed by Shock Records, and was produced by Brumby, Moffatt, Polinski and Paul McKercher. In April 2003 Brumby toured the east coast of Australia as a support act to Michelle Shocked.

2003-2006: "Driving Home" to Into the Blue
Window became Brumby's manager and a member of Monique Brumby & the Riders to tour in support of Brumby's releases. Other members of the Riders for her 2003 single, "Driving Home", were: Shamus Goble on drums and Tom Rouch on electric and slide guitars. She toured extensively throughout Australia, including a performance in her home town of Hobart playing alongside Jewel and george as part of the 'A Day on the Green' concert. Live versions of "The Change in Me" and "Prophecy" by Brumby were released on the associated various artists' album, A Day on the Green, Live!. In 2005 she participated in Garageband, a project from Irish singer, Andy White, she recorded vocals for the band's self-titled album, Garageband. Brumby was the support act on the Australian tour by US group, The Bangles.

In March 2006, Brumby released her third album, Into the Blue, produced by Brumby and Doug Roberts (Deborah Conway, Chris Wilson, Jack Jones, The Badloves). The album was mastered by Leon Zervos at Sterling Sound, NYC, features her version of "Melting", co-written with Paul Kelly, who appeared as a guest performer, as well as guest performances by Michael Spiby and Kerri Simpson.

In October 2006 she played as the support act for Pete Yorn's Australian performances.

2007-present: Skeletons' Polka and Monique Brumby
In 2007 Brumby produced South Australian singer-songwriter, Emily Davis' debut album, Moving in Slow Motion—it was Brumby's first production for another artist.

She has since produced the debut album, Zenith Valley, for Melbourne based acoustic rock group, Mosaik.

Brumby formed Monique Brumby and the Flash Mob, with Shamus Goble, Maryanne Window, Dave Higgins on keyboards and Sophie Turner on guitar. In 2008 they were the support act for another tour by The Bangles. From July 2009, she recorded her fourth album, Skeletons' Polka, co-produced with Mark Opitz.

Brumby undertook a series of album launches starting on 19 March 2010 in Hobart to showcase Skeletons' Polka and its first single, "They're Still Alive", both issued on Little Wing/Rajon.

In 2011, Brumby released "Underground" which was to be released from her fifth album Half Moon, Half Everything (October 2011) but the album never eventuated. 
Monique's self-titled fifth studio album was released in January 2014, which included "Underground" and singles "All the Ways" and "Silent War".

Personal life
In the December 1997 issue of Outrage, Brumby acknowledged that she is a lesbian, and although some see her as a role model, her sexuality is only one facet of her personality and she would rather be described as a musician.

Discography

Studio albums
{| class="wikitable plainrowheaders" style="text-align:center;" border="1"
! scope="col" rowspan="2" style="width:10em;"| Title
! scope="col" rowspan="2" style="width:20em;"| Album details
! scope="col" colspan="1"| Peak chart positions
|-
! scope="col" style="width:3em;font-size:90%;"| AUS
|-
! scope="row"| Thylacine
|
 Released: June 1997
 Label: Sony/Columbia (487196 2)
 Format: CD, Cassette
| 58
|-
! scope="row"| 'Signal Hill|
 Released: October 2002
 Label: Little Wind/Shock Records (M1249)
 Format: CD, Digital
| -
|-
! scope="row"| Into the Blue|
 Released: March 2006
 Label: Little Wind/Rajon Records (CDR0565)
 Format: CD, Digital
| -
|-
! scope="row"| Skeletons' Polka|
 Released: March 2010
 Label: Little Wind/Rajon Records
 Format: CD, Digital
| -
|-
! scope="row"| Monique Brumby|
 Released: January 2014
 Label: Little Wind/Rajon Records (201445667)
 Format: CD, Digital
| -
|}

EPs

Singles

Awards and nominations
ARIA Music Awards
The ARIA Music Awards is an annual awards ceremony that recognises excellence, innovation, and achievement across all genres of Australian music. They commenced in 1987.

|
|-
| rowspan="3"| 1996
| rowspan="2"| "Fool for You"
| ARIA Award for Best New Talent
| 
| rowspan="3"|
|-
| ARIA Award for Breakthrough Artist - Single
| 
|-
| David Bridie for Monique Brumby "Fool for You"
| ARIA Award for Producer of the Year
| 
|-
| rowspan="2"| 1997
| "Mary"
| ARIA Award for Best Female Artist
| 
| rowspan="2"|
|-
| David Bridie for Monique Brumby "Mary"
| Producer of the Year
| 
|-
| rowspan="2"| 1998
| Thylacine''
| Best Female Artist
| 
| rowspan="2"|
|-
| "The Change in Me"
| ARIA Award for Song of the Year
| 
|-

References

External links
Official website
[ Monique Brumby] at allmusic
Monique Brumby at MusicBrainz

1974 births
Living people
ARIA Award winners
Australian women singer-songwriters
Australian women guitarists
Australian rock singers
Lesbian singers
Australian LGBT singers
Australian LGBT songwriters
Lesbian songwriters
Australian lesbian musicians
Musicians from Tasmania
People from Devonport, Tasmania
21st-century Australian singers
21st-century Australian women singers
21st-century guitarists
20th-century Australian LGBT people
21st-century Australian LGBT people
21st-century women guitarists